Qiulong or qiu was a Chinese dragon that is contradictorily defined as "horned dragon" and "hornless dragon".

Name

Characters
This  radical is typically used in Chinese characters for insects, worms, reptiles, and dragons (e.g., shen , jiao , and hong ).

For example, Qiuranke Zhuan  "The Legend of the Curly-whiskered Guest" is a story by the Tang Dynasty writer Du Guangting  (850–933 CE), and Qiu Zhong  was the courtesy name of the Qing Dynasty painter Li Fangying.

Etymologies
Sinological linguists have proposed several etymologies for the qiu or jiu  dragon.

Bernhard Karlgren (1957:274) reconstructed Old Chinese pronunciations of qiu < *g'yŏg or jiu < *kyŏg for  "horned dragon" and  "horn-shaped; long and curved". This latter word combines the "horn radical"  and 's jiu  phonetic.

Carr (1990:151-2) follows Karlgren's reconstructions and suggests qiu < *g'yŏg or jiu < *kyŏg  is "part of a 'twist; coil; wrap' word family" that includes:
qiu < *g'yôg  "long and curved; curled up horn"
jiu < *klyŏg  "curving branch; twist"
miu < *mlyŏg or jiu < *klyŏg  "bind; wind around; wrap; twist"
liu < *glyôg or lu < *glyôk  "join forces; unite"
jiao < *klôg  "glue; unite"
liao < *glyôg  "tie around; strangle"

This "twisting; coiling" etymology can explain both the meanings "horned dragon; twisted horns" and "curling; wriggling" below.

Schuessler compares jiu < *kiuʔ  "to twist, plait" and concludes the "most likely etymology is 'twisting, wriggling'".

Meanings
Chinese dictionaries give three qiu  or  meanings: "dragon without horns ", "dragon with horns", and "curling; coiling".

Hornless dragon
Several Chinese classic texts and commentaries from the Han Dynasty identified qiu  as a "hornless dragon; dragon without horns", which is interpreted as "young dragon; immature dragon".

The (2nd century BCE) Chuci uses qiu  seven times, which is more frequently than any other classical text. Qiu is a dragon name in four contexts. The first uses yuqiu  "jade hornless-dragon"; (tr. Hawkes 1985:73) "I yoked a team of jade dragons to a phoenix-figured car, And waited for the wind to come, to soar up on my journey." The second uses qiulong  "hornless dragon"; (tr. Hawkes 1985:128) "Where are the hornless dragons which carry bears on their backs for sport?" In both contexts, commentary of Wang Yi  (d. 158 CE) says qiu means "hornless dragon" and long means "horned dragon". The third uses qingqiu  "green dragon" referring to the legendary Shun as Chong Hua ; (tr. Hawkes 1985:160) "With a team of azure dragons, white serpents in the traces, I rode with Chong Hua in the Garden of Jasper." Wang notes qiu and chi are types of long "dragons". The fourth uses qiu  alone; (tr. Hawkes 1985:271) "With team of dragons I mount the heavens, In ivory chariot borne aloft."

The (121 CE) Shuowen Jiezi dictionary gives inconsistent definitions of qiu . Some early editions define  "a dragon without horns", while later editions define  "a young dragon with horns". Carr (1990:93-4) notes the discrepancy of three Shuowen definitions for "hornless dragon": qiu , jiao , and chi . The Shuowen Jiezi scholar Zhu Junsheng  (1788–1834 CE) explains that male long  "dragons" have horns and female ones do not, and among young dragons, jiao  has one horn, qiu  has two, and chi  is hornless.

A few later sources, such as the (c. 1011 CE) Guangyun rime dictionary, concur with early Shuowen Jiezi editions and define qiu  as "hornless dragon", but most dictionaries define a contrast set between qiu  "horned dragon" and chi  "hornless dragon".

Horned dragon

The (c. 139 BCE) Huainanzi "Peering into the Obscure" chapter (6) mentions qingqiu  "green horned-dragon" twice. First, "The Fable of the Dragons and the Mud-Eels" uses it with chichi  "red hornless-dragon" (tr. Le Blanc 1987:144); "When the red hornless dragon and the green horned dragon roamed the land of Chi , the sky was limpid and the earth undisturbed." The commentary of Gao Yu  (fl. 205 CE) notes qingqiu and chichi are types of long  "dragons", but without mentioning horns. Second, a description of Fu Xi and Nüwa, who are represented as having dragon tails, uses qingqiu with yinglong  "winged dragon" (tr. Le Blanc 1987:161-2); "They rode the thunder chariot, using winged dragons as the inner pair and green dragons as the outer pair."

The (c. 100 BCE) Shiji "Records of the Grand Historian" biography of Sima Xiangru quotes his fu  poem entitled Zixu  "Sir Fantasy". Like the Huaiananzi, it contrasts qingqiu  "green horned-dragon" with chichi  "red hornless-dragon", which Watson (1993:2:309, 312) translates "horned dragon" and "hornless dragon".

Ge Hong's (4th century CE) Baopuzi  (tr. Visser 1913:73-4) has four references. It mentions: jiu  "As to the flying to the sky of the k'iu of the pools, this is his union with the clouds", shenjiu  "divine horned-dragon" "If a pond inhabited by fishes and gavials is drained off, the divine k'iu go away", and qingjiu  "green horned-dragon" "The ts'ui k'iu (kingfisher-k'iu) has no wings and yet flies upwards to the sky", "Place the shape (i.e. an image of this dragon) in a tray, and the kingfisher-k'iu (shall) descend in a dark vapoury haze".

The (c. 230 CE) Guangya dictionary defines qiu  (written with a rare  "frog"-radical graphic variant) as "horned dragon" and chi  as "hornless dragon". This semantic contrast is repeated in later dictionaries such as the (997 CE) Longkan Shoujian and the (c. 1080 CE) Piya, which says (tr. Visser 1913:73) differentiates: "If a dragon has scales, he is called kiao-lung; if wings, ying-lung; if a horn, k'iu-lung; and if he has no horn, he is called ch'i-lung."

In traditional Chinese art, dragons are commonly represented with two horns. According to the (2nd century CE) Qian fu lun (tr. Visser 1913:70), the dragon's "horns resemble those of a stag". The (1578 CE) Bencao Gangmu materia medica prescribes longjue  "dragon horn" (tr. Read 1934:9, "fossilized horns of the Chalicotherium sinense"), "For convulsions, fevers, diarrhea with fever and hardened belly. Taken continuously it lightens the body, enlightens the soul and prolongs life."

Curling
Qiu can mean "curling; twisting; coiling; wriggling; writhing" in Chinese compounds. For instance:
qiupan  "curled up like a dragon; curling and twisting (esp. tree roots)"
jiaoqiu  "coil like a dragon"
qiuxu  "curly beard; curly mustache"
qiuran  "curly whiskers"

Besides the four "hornless dragon" examples above, three Chuci contexts use qiu in words describing dragons "coiling; wriggling; writhing". Two use youqiu  to describe the canglong  Azure Dragon constellation; (/"Sorrow for Troth Betrayed", cf. qingqiu  "green horned-dragon" above, tr. Hawkes 1985:240) "I rode in the ivory chariot of the Great Unity: The coiling Green Dragon ran in the left-hand traces; The White Tiger made the right hand of my team" (tr. Hawkes 1985:290), "To hang at my girdle the coiling Green Dragon, To wear at my belt the sinuous rainbow serpent." One uses liuqiu  with chi  "hornless dragon" (tr. Hawkes 1985:198); "They lined water monsters up to join them in the dance: How their bodies coiled and writhed in undulating motion!"

Mythic parallels
The ancient Chinese jiu  "horned dragon" is analogous with the Mountain Horned Dragon lizard and several legendary creatures in Comparative mythology.

Assuming trans-cultural diffusion, MacKenzie (1923:54) suggests that the Chinese "horned-dragon, or horned-serpent" derives from the Egyptian Osiris "water-serpent". The Chinese Hui people have a myth (Li and Luckert 1994:104) about a silver-horned dragon that controls rainfall.

In Babylonian mythology, the deity Marduk supposedly rode a horned dragon when he defeated Tiamat, and it became his emblem. In Persian mythology, the hero Garshasp killed an Aži Sruvara "horned dragon". In Greek mythology, the two-headed Amphisbaena dragon was represented with horns.

References

Carr, Michael. 1990. "Chinese Dragon Names", Linguistics of the Tibeto-Burman Area 13.2:87–189.
Coblin, W. South. 1986. A Sinologist's Handlist of Sino-Tibetan Lexical Comparisons. Nettetal.
Hawkes, David, tr. 1985. The Songs of the South: An Anthology of Ancient Chinese Poems by Qu Yuan and Other Poets. Penguin.
Karlgren, Bernhard. 1957. Grammata Serica Recensa. Museum of Far Eastern Antiquities.
Le Blanc, Charles. 1985. Huai-nan Tzu: Philosophical Synthesis in Early Han Thought: The Idea of Resonance (Kan-Ying) With a Translation and Analysis of Chapter Six. Hong Kong University Press.
Li Shujiang and Karl W. Luckert. 1994. Mythology and Folklore of the Hui, a Muslim Chinese People. SUNY Press.
Mackenzie, Donald A. 1923. Myths of China and Japan. Gresham.
Read, Bernard E. 1934. "Chinese Materia Medica VII; Dragons and Snakes," Peking Natural History Bulletin 8.4:279–362.
Schuessler, Axel. 2007. ABC Etymological Dictionary of Old Chinese. University of Hawaii Press.
Visser, Marinus Willern de. 1913. The Dragon in China and Japan. J. Müller.
Watson, Burton, tr. 1993. Records of the Grand Historian, by Sima Qian. Columbia University Press.

External links
 entry, Chinese Etymology
 and  entry page, 1716 CE Kangxi Dictionary

Chinese dragons